"Ah Yeah!" is a song written and performed by Australian producer and DJ Will Sparks. It was released on Hussle label in November 2012. In February 2015 it peaked in the top 60 on the French and Swedish singles charts. In April of that year Katie Cunningham of In the Mix credited "Ah Yeah!" for giving rise to a new electro house sub-genre, Melbourne bounce. The track gained exposure by Calvin Harris and A-Trak with Sparks recalling he "went from 'hardly getting gigs in Melbourne' to getting booked every weekend for shows around the world".

In November 2014, it was re-released as "Ah Yeah So What" on Hussle / Ministry of Sound and featured Wiley and Elen Levon. This version was co-written by Sparks with Wiley, Ilan Kidron and Levon. It reached No. 4 in Australia, No. 12 in Finland and top 40 in New Zealand.

Background 

Will Sparks had left Caulfield Grammar at the end of year 11 to pursue a career as a performing DJ. He described his music as Melbourne bounce and performed at local pubs and clubs – he started to post tracks on social media during 2012. An early single is the self-written "Ah Yeah!", which appeared in November of that year.

"Ah Yeah!" reached No. 12 on the ARIA Club Tracks component chart in February 2013. The Various Artists compilation album Urban Dance 6 (October 2013) included it as a track. By that time "Ah Yeah!" was listed at No. 3 on Beatport's chart. In February 2015 "Oh Yeah!" peaked in the top 60 on the French and Swedish singles charts. It was listed at No. 62 of In the Mix 100 Greatest Australian Dance Tracks of All Time in April of that year. Katie Cunningham of In the Mix credited "Ah Yeah!" for giving rise to the new electro house sub-genre of Melbourne bounce.

"Ah Yeah So What" 

In 2014, Will Sparks collaborated with Wiley and Elen Levon to re-record "Ah Yeah!", which was released in November as the single "Ah Yeah So What" on Hussle / Ministry of Sound. This version was co-written by Sparks with Richard Cowie (Wiley), Ilan Kidron and Elen Menaker (Levon). It reached No. 4 in Australia, No. 12 in Finland and top 40 in New Zealand.

Charts

Ah Yeah!

 
Ah Yeah So What

Year-end charts

Certifications

References

2012 songs
2014 singles
Ministry of Sound singles
Songs written by Wiley (musician)
Songs written by Ilan Kidron